Sergio Martínez (born November 1936) is a Colombian former swimmer. He competed in the men's 100 metre freestyle at the 1956 Summer Olympics.

References

External links
 

1936 births
Living people
Colombian male freestyle swimmers
Olympic swimmers of Colombia
Swimmers at the 1956 Summer Olympics
Place of birth missing (living people)
20th-century Colombian people